Vanarion is a historic and titular diocese of the Roman Catholic Church. The seat of the bishopric was a Roman town called Vanarion, founded in the Roman province of Mauretania Caesariensis, which has been tentatively identified with ruins at Ksar-Tyr in northern Algeria.  At present the Catholic bishops are titular.  Between 2005 and May 13, 2013 the Bishop of Vanariony was auxiliary bishop of Katowice, Józef Kupny, he was replaced by Prosper Balthazar Lyimo of Tanzania, in 2014.

Bishops
Pelagio (fl.411) (Donatist)
 Raymond James Vonesh Joliet's auxiliary bishop in Illinois (USA) January 5, 1968 – August 16, 1991
 Filipe Neri Ferrão Auxiliary bishop Goa e Damão (India December 20, 1993 – December 12, 2003
 Józef Kupny Auxiliary bishop of Katowice December 21, 2005 – May 18, 2013
 Prosper Balthazar Lyimo Arusha auxiliary bishop (Tanzania) November 11, 2014

References

Religion in Algeria
Ancient Rome
Former Roman Catholic dioceses